Albertsen is a surname. Notable people with the surname include:

Georg Albertsen (1889–1961), Danish gymnast
Heidi Albertsen (born 1976), Danish model
Johnny Albertsen (born 1977), Danish alpine skier
Roger Albertsen (1957–2003), Norwegian footballer
Ubbo J. Albertsen (1845–1926), American politician and businessman

See also
 Albertson (disambiguation)

Patronymic surnames
Danish-language surnames
Norwegian-language surnames